Tales from the Script: Greatest Hits is the first greatest hits album by Irish pop rock band The Script. It was released on 1 October 2021 through Phonogenic Records and Sony Music Entertainment. The album includes singles from all six of the band's preceding studio albums, as well as a brand new song, and a song from their 2018 Acoustic Sessions EP. It was preceded by the single "I Want It All", and was supported by a worldwide tour which took place throughout 2022 and spanned North America, Europe and Australia.

The album debuted at number one in the albums charts in both Ireland and the UK.

Commercial performance
Tales from the Script: Greatest Hits debuted at number one on the UK Albums Chart dated 8 October 2021, becoming the Script's sixth UK number-one album. It also debuted atop the Irish Albums Chart, becoming the band's seventh chart-topping album in their home country and extending their unbroken string of number-one albums there.

Promotion

Tales From The Script - Greatest Hits Tour 

a Mark Sheehan was absent from the band's North America leg due to wanting to spend time with his family.

Track listing
All Songs written by Danny O'Donoghue and Mark Sheehan except where indicated

Charts

Weekly charts

Year-end charts

Certifications

References

2021 greatest hits albums
Sony Music compilation albums
The Script albums